Robert Carruthers (1799–1878) was a Scottish journalist and miscellaneous writer.

He was born in Dumfriesshire and was for a time a teacher in Huntingdon. He wrote a History of Huntingdon in 1824. In 1828 he became editor of the Inverness Courier, in which role he continued for many years.

He edited Alexander Pope's works with a memoir (1853), and along with Robert Chambers edited the first edition of Chambers' Cyclopædia of English Literature (1842–44). He received the degree of LL.D. from Edinburgh.

One of his daughters married the sculptor Alexander Munro.

References

External links
 
 
 

Scottish journalists
1799 births
1878 deaths
19th-century Scottish historians
19th-century British journalists
British male journalists
People from Dumfries and Galloway
Scottish schoolteachers
Scottish newspaper editors
Scottish book editors
Scottish lexicographers
Scottish literary critics
Alumni of the University of Edinburgh
19th-century British male writers
19th-century British writers
19th-century lexicographers